Mike Vest is an American sports executive who co-founded Lionsbridge FC, and previously held senior-level roles at the Atlantic 10 Conference, IMG and Big Ten Network. Vest has been at the forefront of new trends at the intersection of sports, social media and media rights.

Early life 
Vest graduated from Blue Valley Northwest High School in Overland Park, Kan., in 1996. He earned a bachelor's degree in 2000 from the William Allen White School of Journalism at the University of Kansas.

Career 
While still an undergraduate, Vest began his career at the University of Kansas under the tutelage of future CoSIDA Hall of Famers Doug Vance and Dean Buchan.

From 2000-07, Vest worked in the athletic department at Wake Forest University, most closely with the men's soccer, baseball and football programs.

In 2007, Vest moved to Chicago to help launch the Big Ten Network as one of its original 25 employees. He managed public relations and publicity for network executives and talent. Vest also oversaw social media and developed one of the television industry's first Second Screen experiences with BTN Connect in conjunction with Spredfast.

In 2014, Vest joined the Atlantic 10 Conference as Associate Commissioner for External Affairs. There, Vest led negotiations that led the Atlantic 10 Conference to become the first NCAA conference to sign a media rights agreement with Facebook. Since then, such content deals have become more commonplace in college athletics.

In 2017, Vest partnered with Newport News business executives Kevin Joyce and Dan Chenoweth to begin planning to launch of Lionsbridge FC.

Personal life 
Vest is a lifelong fan of Kansas City sports, specifically the Kansas City Royals and Kansas City Chiefs. He is also a fan of the Chicago Cubs and Red Panda, a college athletics performer.

References 

1978 births
Living people
University of Kansas alumni
American sports executives and administrators